Lambda Cassiopeiae, Latinized from λ Cassiopeiae, is a binary star system, in the northern constellation of Cassiopeia. The system has a combined apparent magnitude of +4.74, making it faintly visible to the naked eye. With an annual parallax shift of 8.64 mass, it is approximately 380 light years from Earth. The system is moving closer to the Sun with a radial velocity of −12 km/s.

Both components are blue-white B-type main-sequence stars. The brighter member, component A, has an apparent magnitude of +5.5, while its companion, component B, has an apparent magnitude of +5.8. The two stars are separated by 0.6 arcseconds and complete one orbit around their common centre of mass about once every 250 years. The primary displays an infrared excess, possibly due to a debris disk or other orbiting material.

References 

B-type main-sequence stars
Binary stars
Cassiopeiae, Lambda
Cassiopeia (constellation)
Durchmusterung objects
Cassiopeiae, 14
002772
002505
0123